Valentin Vladimirovich Filatov (born 19 March 1982) is a Russian former footballer who played as a defender.

Personal life
On 5 October 2003 Filatov's parents died in a car crash on their way to watch a league game of Zenit St. Petersburg, that led to a long depression for him and a drop-off in performance.

References

External links
 
 
 

1982 births
Footballers from Saint Petersburg
Living people
Russian footballers
Association football defenders
FC Zenit Saint Petersburg players
PFC Spartak Nalchik players
FC Rostov players
FC Khimki players
Russian Premier League players
Liga I players
Liga II players
FC Unirea Urziceni players
Russian expatriate footballers
Expatriate footballers in Romania
Russian expatriate sportspeople in Romania
FC Tosno players
FC Dynamo Saint Petersburg players
FC Petrotrest players
FC Zenit-2 Saint Petersburg players
FC Nosta Novotroitsk players